Mario del Tránsito Cocomarola (San Cosme, Corrientes, August 15, 1918 – September 19, 1974) was an Argentine musician and folklorist, and is known as one of the most influential figures of chamamé.

His repertoire of about 400 compositions included some classics such as "Kilometro 11", "Puente Pexoa", and "Rincón dichoso" y "Retorno".

In the 1930s and 1940s he joined several musical ensembles, such as "Los hijos de Corrientes", el "Trío típico Correntino", "Los Kunumí", and the "Trío Taragüí". In 1942 he recorded his first album in the Odeon, which would later kick start a solo career that lasted until the year of his death. He played alongside most great figures of the genre, including: Roque L. Gonzalez, Juan Ayala, Antonio Niz, the duo Veron-Palacios, the duo Vera-Lucero, the Trio Lisardo Caceres-Evaristo Reyes-Hipolito Argentino Vargas, and singers like Gregory Molina, Julio Godoy, Luis Soloaga, Irenaeus Ramirez, Carlos Ramirez (singer), Elpidio Miño Veron, Juan Ojeda, and Alejandro and Alfredo Almeida.

After a complication during a gall bladder operation, he died on September 19, 1974. In Corrientes, the Provincial Act No. 3278 established that date as the "Chamamé Day." He was posthumously named "Illustrious Citizen of the City of Corrientes".

References

1918 births
1974 deaths
20th-century composers
Argentine composers
Argentine songwriters
Argentine male writers
People from Corrientes Province
Male songwriters
20th-century Argentine musicians
20th-century male musicians